John Allen Pugsley (January 5, 1934 – April 8, 2011) was an American voluntaryist libertarian political, economics commentator, lecturer, and best-selling author.

Early life
Pugsley was born in Minnesota. He attended El Camino Junior College, the University of Florida, and graduated from UCLA. After serving in the U.S. Army, he spent a year cruising on a 38-foot sailboat, and another year living in Mexico with his wife and children. He then returned to the U.S. and spent the next two decades as a businessman.

Career
In the late 1950s to mid 1960s Pugsley worked at General Dynamics – Astronautics Sycamore Canyon Rocket Test facility as a technical writer. Among other projects, he wrote countdown procedures for Atlas and Centaur Rocket tests.

In the late 1960s Pugsley entered the investment business, founded a publishing company, the Common Sense Press, and wrote his first book, Common Sense Economics. It sold over 150,000 hardcover copies. His second book, The Alpha Strategy (1980), was on the New York Times bestseller list for nine weeks in 1981. Pugsley distributed a PDF edition of the book free of charge (as of 2012, the author's domain has expired. A reposting of the PDF has been provided by fans). Even after 31 years in circulation as of 2012, The Alpha Strategy is considered a standard reference on stocking up on food and household goods as a hedge against inflation. This has made it popular with survivalists.

In Common Sense Economics Pugsley cites as influences Murray Rothbard, Henry Hazlitt, and Ludwig von Mises, and subsequent works also cite Andrew J. Galambos. In 1995 he authored an open letter to Harry Browne advising him against running for president; Pugsley's argument was based on the principles of voluntaryism and non-voting.

In 1975 he began a newsletter on economic and political events, Common Sense Viewpoint (1974), which had 30,000 subscribers at its peak. In 1988 he began publishing John Pugsley's Journal, an investment-economic newsletter covering political, economic, and investment topics.

In the mid-1970s, after reading E.O. Wilson's book Sociobiology: The New Synthesis, Pugsley began to study evolutionary biology. As his study continued over the next 25 years, he founded The Bio-Rational Institute.

Pugsley was one of the founding members of The Eris Society. In 1997, he helped found The Sovereign Society, an international organization dedicated to maintaining and protecting its members' privacy, wealth and liberty. The society is primarily geared toward expatriate relocation, offshore banking and trusts. Pugsley was the society's chairman at the time of his death and wrote a monthly column for its e-newsletter, The Sovereign Individual. In 2006, he founded "The Stealth Investor", a weekly e-letter stock advisory letter.

Later years and death
Near the end of his life, Pugsley lived in Carlsbad, California, and just before moving there he lived aboard a 50-foot sloop named Eris Island in the Abacos, Bahamas, with Kiana Delamare. Delamare has written for EscapeArtist.com and the International Living e-newsletter.

Pugsley died at age 77 on April 8, 2011.

Books authored
 Common Sense Economics (1974) 
 The Metals Investors Handbook (1983) 
 The Alpha Strategy: The Ultimate Plan of Financial Self-Defense for the Small Investor (1980) 
 The Bank Book (1981) 
 The Copper Play (1980)
 The Interest Rate Strategy (1982)

See also
 Retreat (survivalism)
 Survivalism
 Self-sufficiency
 Voluntaryism

References

External links
 The Stealth Investor
 Reposted PDF of The Alpha Strategy
 The Eris Society

1934 births
2011 deaths
20th-century American male writers
20th-century American non-fiction writers
21st-century American male writers
21st-century American non-fiction writers
American economics writers
American finance and investment writers
American libertarians
American male bloggers
American bloggers
American male non-fiction writers
American political commentators
American political writers
People from Carlsbad, California
Survivalists
University of California, Los Angeles alumni
Voluntaryists
Writers from California
Writers from Minnesota